John "Jack" Roos was a Canadian ice hockey player and coach who led the program at Clarkson to three eastern intercollegiate titles in the 1930s.

Career
Roos played junior hockey in and around the Ottawa area as well as at the University of Ottawa. After graduating, he travelled to Minnesota and played for the Duluth Hornets and St. Paul Saints throughout most of the 1920s. In 1929, after the death of star player Harry Heintzman and the resignation of Gordon Croskery, Roos was brought in to be the head coach at Clarkson. He helped steady the program and nearly led them to a championship in his second season.

After a few mediocre years, Roos got the program to break through with a title in 1935 and followed that up with a second championship the next year (shared with Harvard). In 1938 he got the Golden Knights to perform better than they had before and finished with a 13–1–1 record and earned their third eastern title. On top of that, Clarkson was named by the associated press as the national ice hockey champion, though that title isn't official. With three titles in 4 years, Clarkson University finally agreed to build a long-called-for ice rink for the program and the Clarkson Arena was completed in time for the following season.

Roos had another near miss championship in 1941 and then watched as World War II sapped both his team and all of college hockey of their players. The Knights tried to soldier on but, after a winless season in 1944, finally succumbed to the inevitable and suspended operations. The team returned in 1946 with Roos still at the helm and he began to rebuild the Knights. After a solid, if unspectacular, season in 1948, Roos retired from his position and turned the program over to Bill Harrison.

Statistics

Regular season and playoffs

Note: Statistics are incomplete.

Head coaching record

References

External links
 

1897 births
Year of death unknown
Canadian ice hockey defencemen
St. Paul Athletic Club ice hockey players
Clarkson Golden Knights men's ice hockey players
Sportspeople from Quebec
Ice hockey people from Quebec